Johnny Rommel is an Indian canoeing athlete who had won the bronze medal in men's C-2 1000M at the 1994 Asian Games.

References

Year of birth missing (living people)
Living people
Indian male canoeists
Asian Games medalists in canoeing
Canoeists at the 1994 Asian Games
Medalists at the 1994 Asian Games
Asian Games bronze medalists for India